Abdulovo (Abdulla) is a rural locality (a selo) in Staroturayevsky Selsoviet of Yermekeyevsky District, Bashkortostan, Russia. The population was 230 as of 2010. There are 3 streets.

Geography 
Abdulovo is located 38 km northwest of Yermekeyevo (the district's administrative centre) by road. Kit-Ozero is the nearest rural locality.

Ethnicity 
The village is inhabited by Bashkirs and others.

References 

Rural localities in Yermekeyevsky District